Fuka-Arthur Masuaku Kawela (born 7 November 1993), known as Arthur Masuaku, is a professional footballer who plays as a wing-back or left back for Süper Lig club Beşiktaş, on loan from  club West Ham United. Born in France, he represents the DR Congo national team.

Masuaku began his senior career with Valenciennes, and has also played for Olympiacos. He represented France at youth level before switching his allegiance to DR Congo in 2017.

Club career

Valenciennes
Masuaku was born in Lille. He came through the youth system of Valenciennes. He made his Ligue 1 debut on the opening game of the 2013–14 season on 10 August 2013 against Toulouse. He was substituted after 75 minutes for Tongo Doumbia. On 29 January 2014 Masuaku scored his first competitive goal for Valenciennes in a 2–1 away defeat against Marseille.

Olympiacos
In July 2014, Masuaku signed for Olympiacos. He made his Superleague debut against Niki Volos, and in his third league match he provided two assists against OFI Crete in a 3–0 home win. Three days later he made his debut and scored in the UEFA Champions League competition against Atlético Madrid in a 3–2 home win.

In April and May 2015, interest from Roma, Internazionale and Juventus was reported. His agent, Roger Henrotay, however stated a renewal of Masuaku's contract was on the cards. In July, a reported €4 million offer for Masuaku including former Olympiacos midfielder Giannis Fetfatzidis from Genoa was rejected by the club.

West Ham United

On 8 August 2016, Masuaku joined West Ham United on a four-year contract for a £6.2 million fee. He made his West Ham debut in a 2–1 away defeat to Chelsea on 15 August 2016. Masuaku admitted that he found his Premier League debut very tough due to the pace and physicality of the league. He scored his first goal for West Ham in an EFL Cup tie against Bolton Wanderers on 19 September 2017.

In the FA Cup fourth round game against Wigan Athletic on 27 January 2018, Masuaku was sent off for spitting at Wigan's Nick Powell following a challenge. It was the first sending-off of Masuaku's career. Masuaku apologised for the sending off, saying the incident was "totally unacceptable and out of character". He received a six match ban for the offence.

In July 2019, having played 75 times for West Ham, Masuaku signed a contract extension with the club until 2024 with an option to further extend the contract for two years.

On 4 December 2021, Masuaku scored the winning goal in a 3–2 victory over defending UEFA Champions League winners Chelsea. The goal, a mishit cross that caught out Chelsea goalkeeper Edouard Mendy at his near post, was his first ever Premier League goal.

Beşiktaş 
On 2 August 2022, Masuaku joined Turkish team  Beşiktaş on a season long loan with an option to buy in 2023.

International career
Having represented France at under-18 and under-19 level, Masuaku switched his allegiance to DR Congo in June 2017.  In August 2017, he was called into his first DR Congo squad, for two 2018 World Cup qualification games against Tunisia. In March 2018, still yet to make his international debut, Masuaku travelled with the DR Congo squad for a friendly against Tanzania. He was one of four players to drop out before the game, amidst claims of organisational problems and travel disorder, and did not appear. He made his debut on 13 October 2018, starting in a 1–2 home loss against Zimbabwe in a 2019 Africa Cup of Nations qualification game. Masuaku scored his first goal for DR Congo, a free-kick, in a 1–1 away draw with Kenya on 15 June 2019.

Career statistics

Club

International

As of match played 29 March 2022. Scores and results list DR Congo's goal tally first.

Honours
Olympiacos
Super League Greece: 2014–15, 2015–16
Greek Cup: 2014–15; runner-up: 2015–16

Individual

Super League Greece Team of the Year: 2014–15, 2015–16

References

External links

 
 Arthur Masuaku at West Ham United F.C. (archived)
 
 
 
 
 

1993 births
Living people
Footballers from Lille
Democratic Republic of the Congo footballers
Democratic Republic of the Congo international footballers
French footballers
France youth international footballers
Association football defenders
Valenciennes FC players
Olympiacos F.C. players
West Ham United F.C. players
Ligue 1 players
Super League Greece players
Premier League players
2019 Africa Cup of Nations players
Democratic Republic of the Congo expatriate footballers
French expatriate footballers
Expatriate footballers in England
Expatriate footballers in Greece
French expatriate sportspeople in England
French expatriate sportspeople in Greece
Democratic Republic of the Congo expatriate sportspeople in England
Democratic Republic of the Congo expatriate sportspeople in Greece
French sportspeople of Democratic Republic of the Congo descent
Black French sportspeople
Expatriate footballers in Turkey
Beşiktaş J.K. footballers
Democratic Republic of the Congo expatriate sportspeople in Turkey
Süper Lig players